Derbyshire County Cricket Club in 1962 was the cricket season when the English club Derbyshire had been playing for ninety-one years. It was their fifty-eighth season in the County Championship and they won 9 championship matches and lost six to finish seventh in the County Championship.

1962 season

Derbyshire played 28 games in the County Championship, one match against the touring Pakistinis and one match against Oxford University.  They won nine matches, lost six matches and drew fifteen matches. Donald Carr was in his eighth year as captain.  Laurie Johnson was top scorer and Les Jackson took most wickets for the club.

There were no new players in the Derbyshire team.

Matches

{| class="wikitable" width="100%"
! bgcolor="#efefef" colspan=6 | List of matches
|- bgcolor="#efefef"
!No.
!Date
!V
!Result 
!Margin
!Notes
|-
|1
|5 May 1962  
 | Lancashire County Ground, Derby   
|bgcolor="#FFCC00"|Drawn
 |  
|    C Lee 137; IR Buxton 108
|- 
|2
|12 May 1962  
 | Essex   Valentine's Park, Ilford   
 |bgcolor="#00FF00"|Won 
 |  7 wickets
|    HL Jackson 6–25 and 5–65
|- 
|3
|16 May 1962  
|  Sussex   Queen's Park, Chesterfield   
|bgcolor="#FFCC00"|Drawn
 |  
|    
|- 
|4
|19 May 1962  
| Nottinghamshire Trent Bridge, Nottingham 
|bgcolor="#FFCC00"|Drawn
 |  
|    Davison 7–28
|- 
|5
|23 May 1962  
 |  Gloucestershire  County Ground, Derby  
 |bgcolor="#00FF00"|Won 
 |  4 wickets
|    Nicholls 144; 
|- 
|6
|26 May 1962  
 | Kent Bat and Ball Ground, Gravesend  
|bgcolor="#FFCC00"|Drawn
 |  
|    
|- 
|7
|30 May 1962  
 | Oxford University   The University Parks, Oxford 
 |bgcolor="#00FF00"|Won 
 |  10 wickets
|    Baig 103; R Swallow 115; HJ Rhodes 5–41 
|- 
|8
|2 Jun 1962  
| Lancashire  Old Trafford, Manchester  
|bgcolor="#FFCC00"|Drawn
 |  
|    DC Morgan 5–72 
|- 
|9
|6 Jun 1962  
| SomersetImperial Athletic Ground, Bristol  
|bgcolor="#FFCC00"|Drawn
 |  
|    WF Oates 101; Atkinson 105 and 6–113; HL Johnson 108; HJ Rhodes 5–73
|- 
|10
|9 Jun 1962  
| LeicestershireCounty Ground, Derby  
 |bgcolor="#00FF00"|Won 
 | 165 runs 
|    DB Carr 110; Watson 142; HL Jackson 6–26 and 7–47
|- 
|11
|13 Jun 1962 
| YorkshireThe Circle, Hull  
|bgcolor="#FF0000"|Lost 
 |  Innings and 31 runs
|    Stott 145 
|- 
|12
|16 Jun 1962  
 | Glamorgan  Queen's Park, Chesterfield  
 |bgcolor="#00FF00"|Won 
 |  6 wickets
|    Shepherd 5–41
|- 
|13
|20 Jun 1962  
 | Essex   County Ground, Derby   
 |bgcolor="#00FF00"|Won 
 |  5 wickets
|    HL Jackson 7–35 
|- 
|14
|23 Jun 1962  
 | Yorkshire Queen's Park, Chesterfield 
|bgcolor="#FFCC00"|Drawn
 |  
|   E Smith 5–39
|- 
|15
|27 Jun 1962  
|  Sussex   Manor Sports Ground, Worthing   
|bgcolor="#FFCC00"|Drawn
 |  
|    HL Johnson 114; Bell 5–92
|- 
|16
|30 Jun 1962  
| Hampshire County Ground, Derby 
|bgcolor="#FF0000"|Lost 
 |  5 wickets
|    Ingleby-Mackenzie 111 
|- 
|17
|7 Jul 1962  
| HampshireUnited Services Recreation Ground, Portsmouth   
|bgcolor="#FFCC00"|Drawn
 |  
|    Gray 213; DC Morgan 112; Shackleton 5–112 
|- 
|18
|11 Jul 1962  
| Northamptonshire County Ground, Northampton  
|bgcolor="#FF0000"|Lost 
 |  71 runs
|    E Smith 5–39; Allen 5–41
|- 
|19
|14 Jul 1962  
| Pakistan   Ind Coope Ground, Burton-on-Trent  
|bgcolor="#FFCC00"|Drawn
 |  
|    
|- 
|20
|21 Jul 1962  
| Northamptonshire Rutland Recreation Ground, Ilkeston    
|bgcolor="#FFCC00"|Drawn
 |  
|    
|- 
|21
|25 Jul 1962  
| Northamptonshire Park Road Ground, Buxton  
 |bgcolor="#00FF00"|Won 
 |  7 wickets
|    Milburn 102; DC Morgan 6–13; Larter 5–67
|- 
|22
|28 Jul 1962  
|  WorcestershireTipton Road, Dudley  
|bgcolor="#FF0000"|Lost 
 |  5 wickets
|    Coldwell 8–64 
|- 
|23
|1 Aug 1962  
 | Warwickshire  Queen's Park, Chesterfield  
|bgcolor="#FFCC00"|Drawn
 |  
|    Hitchcock 153; M Smith 105 
|- 
|24
|4 Aug 1962  
| LeicestershireGrace Road, Leicester  
|bgcolor="#FFCC00"|Drawn
 |  
|    HL Johnson 154 
|- 
|25
|8 Aug 1962  
|  Surrey Kennington Oval  
|bgcolor="#FF0000"|Lost 
 |  5 wickets
|    Lock 6–41; DC Morgan 6–32
|- 
|26
|11 Aug 1962  
| Warwickshire Edgbaston, Birmingham   
|bgcolor="#FFCC00"|Drawn
 |  
|    M Smith 148 
|- 
|27
|15 Aug 1962  
|  Worcestershire Queen's Park, Chesterfield 
|bgcolor="#FFCC00"|Drawn
 |  
|    Rumsey 7–50; HJ Rhodes 6–30 
|- 
|28
|18 Aug 1962  
 | Glamorgan  St Helen's, Swansea  
 |bgcolor="#00FF00"|Won 
 |  204 runs
|    Wheatley 5–52; Shepherd 5–60 
|- 
|29
|22 Aug 1962  
| SomersetCounty Ground, Derby  
|bgcolor="#FF0000"|Lost 
 |  41 runs
|    HJ Rhodes 5–45 and 5–19; Alley 5–53; HL Jackson 5–20
|- 
|30
|25 Aug 1962  
 | Middlesex    Queen's Park, Chesterfield  
 |bgcolor="#00FF00"|Won 
|  8 wickets
|    HJ Rhodes 5–58; Titmus 6–86
|-

Statistics

County Championship batting averages

County Championship bowling averages

Wicket Keeping
Bob Taylor	Catches 77, Stumping 3 
Ian Hall	Catches 2

See also
Derbyshire County Cricket Club seasons
1962 English cricket season

References

1962 in English cricket
Derbyshire County Cricket Club seasons